The boys' ice hockey tournament at the 2020 Winter Youth Olympics was held from 18 to 22 January at the Vaudoise Aréna in Lausanne, Switzerland.

The Russian team won its first Youth Olympics gold medal, outscoring its opponents 29–3 throughout the tournament.

Preliminary round
All times are local (UTC+1).

Group A

Group B

Playoff round

Bracket

Semifinals

Bronze medal game

Gold medal game

Final ranking

References

Boys' tournament